Zhoukou East railway station is a railway station in Chuanhui District, Zhoukou, Henan, China. It opened on 1 December 2019. It is an intermediate stop on the Zhengzhou–Fuyang high-speed railway and will be the eastern terminus of the planned Pingdingshan–Luohe–Zhoukou high-speed railway.

There are three island platforms (for six platform faces total) and two bypass lines without platforms.

References 

Railway stations in Henan
Railway stations in China opened in 2019